Raitt is a surname. Notable people with the name include:

Alan Raitt (1930–2006), British scholar of French literature
Bay Raitt (fl. 1980s-present), United States digital modeler and animator, currently working in New Zealand
Bonnie Raitt (born 1949), United States musician
Douglas S. Raitt (died 1944), Scottish marine biologist
George Raitt (1880s – ?), Scottish athlete in football (played for Huddersfield Town)
John Raitt (1917–2005), United States actor and singer
Lisa Raitt, PC, MP (born 1968), Canadian politician, the Conservative Party Member of Parliament for the riding of Halton
Noel Raitt (born 1943), Australian athlete in Australian-rules football (played for Essendon during the 1960s)

See also
Bonnie Raitt (album), the self-titled debut album by Bonnie Raitt, released in 1971
Raitt, Kangra, Development Block of District Kangra in Himachal Pradesh India
Raitt's sand eel, Ammodytes marinus, is a fish in the family Ammodytidae